Chipili District is a district of Zambia, located in Luapula Province. It was separated from Mwense District in 2012.

References

Districts of Luapula Province